In number theory, the nth Pisano period, written as (n), is the period with which the sequence of Fibonacci numbers taken modulo n repeats.  Pisano periods are named after Leonardo Pisano, better known as Fibonacci. The existence of periodic functions in Fibonacci numbers was noted by Joseph Louis Lagrange in 1774.

Definition 

The Fibonacci numbers are the numbers in the integer sequence:
0, 1, 1, 2, 3, 5, 8, 13, 21, 34, 55, 89, 144, 233, 377, 610, 987, 1597, 2584, 4181, 6765, 10946, 17711, 28657, 46368, ... 
defined by the recurrence relation

For any integer n, the sequence of Fibonacci numbers Fi taken modulo n is periodic.
The Pisano period, denoted (n), is the length of the period of this sequence. For example, the sequence of Fibonacci numbers modulo 3 begins: 
0, 1, 1, 2, 0, 2, 2, 1, 0, 1, 1, 2, 0, 2, 2, 1, 0, 1, 1, 2, 0, 2, 2, 1, 0, ... 
This sequence has period 8, so (3) = 8.

Properties

With the exception of (2) = 3, the Pisano period (n) is always even. 
A simple proof of this can be given by observing that (n) is equal to the order of the Fibonacci matrix

in the general linear group GL2(ℤn) of invertible 2 by 2 matrices in the finite ring ℤn of integers modulo n. Since Q has determinant −1, the determinant of Q(n) is (−1)(n), and since this must equal 1 in ℤn, either n ≤ 2 or (n) is even.

If m and n are coprime, then (mn) is the least common multiple of (m) and (n), by the Chinese remainder theorem. For example, (3) = 8 and (4) = 6 imply (12) = 24.  Thus the study of Pisano periods may be reduced to that of Pisano periods of prime powers q = pk, for k ≥ 1.

If p is prime, (pk) divides pk–1 (p). It is unknown if

for every prime p and integer k > 1. Any prime p providing a counterexample would necessarily be a Wall–Sun–Sun prime, and conversely every Wall–Sun–Sun prime p gives a counterexample (set k = 2).

So the study of Pisano periods may be further reduced to that of Pisano periods of primes. In this regard, two primes are anomalous. The prime 2 has an odd Pisano period, and the prime 5 has period that is relatively much larger than the Pisano period of any other prime. The periods of powers of these primes are as follows:
 If n = 2k, then (n) = 3·2k–1 =  = .
 if n = 5k, then (n) = 20·5k–1 =  = 4n.

From these it follows that if n = 2·5k then  (n) = 6n.

If p is a prime different from 2 and 5, then the modulo p analogue of Binet's formula implies that (p) is the multiplicative order of a root of  modulo p. Thus their order, (p) is a divisor of p − 1. For example, (11) = 11 − 1 = 10 and (29) = (29 − 1)/2 = 14.

As the Frobenius automorphism  exchanges these roots, it follows that, denoting them by r and s, we have r p = s, and thus r p+1 = –1. That is r 2(p+1) = 1, and the Pisano period, which is the order of r, is the quotient of 2(p+1) by an odd divisor. This quotient is always a multiple of 4. (See the table below)

It follows from above results, that if n = pk is an odd prime power such that (n) > n, then (n)/4 is an integer that is not greater than n. The multiplicative property of Pisano periods imply thus that
(n) ≤ 6n, with equality if and only if n = 2 · 5r, for r ≥ 1.

The first examples are (10) = 60 and (50) = 300. If n is not of the form 2 · 5r, then (n) ≤ 4n.

Tables 
The first twelve Pisano periods  and their cycles (with spaces before the zeros for readability) are (using hexadecimal cyphers A and B for ten and eleven, respectively):

The first 144 Pisano periods are shown in the following table:

Pisano periods of Fibonacci numbers

If n = F(2k) (k ≥ 2), then π(n) = 4k; if n = F(2k + 1) (k ≥ 2), then π(n) = 8k + 4. That is, if the modulo base is a Fibonacci number (≥ 3) with an even index, the period is twice the index and the cycle has two zeros. If the base is a Fibonacci number (≥ 5) with an odd index, the period is four times the index and the cycle has four zeros.

Pisano periods of Lucas numbers
If n = L(2k) (k ≥ 1), then π(n) = 8k; if n = L(2k + 1) (k ≥ 1), then π(n) = 4k + 2. That is, if the modulo base is a Lucas number (≥ 3) with an even index, the period is four times the index. If the base is a Lucas number (≥ 4) with an odd index, the period is twice the index.

For even k, the cycle has two zeros. For odd k, the cycle has only one zero, and the second half of the cycle, which is of course equal to the part on the left of 0, consists of alternatingly numbers F(2m + 1) and n − F(2m), with m decreasing.

Number of zeros in the cycle

The number of occurrences of 0 per cycle is 1, 2, or 4. Let p be the number after the first 0 after the combination 0, 1. Let the distance between the 0s be q.
There is one 0 in a cycle, obviously, if p = 1. This is only possible if q is even or n is 1 or 2.
Otherwise there are two 0s in a cycle if p2 ≡ 1. This is only possible if q is even.
Otherwise there are four 0s in a cycle. This is the case if q is odd and n is not 1 or 2.

For generalized Fibonacci sequences (satisfying the same recurrence relation, but with other initial values, e.g. the Lucas numbers) the number of occurrences of 0 per cycle is 0, 1, 2, or 4.

The ratio of the Pisano period of n and the number of zeros modulo n in the cycle gives the rank of apparition or Fibonacci entry point of n. That is, smallest index k such that n divides F(k). They are:

1, 3, 4, 6, 5, 12, 8, 6, 12, 15, 10, 12, 7, 24, 20, 12, 9, 12, 18, 30, 8, 30, 24, 12, 25, 21, 36, 24, 14, 60, 30, 24, 20, 9, 40, 12, 19, 18, 28, 30, 20, 24, 44, 30, 60, 24, 16, 12, ... 

In Renault's paper the number of zeros is called the "order" of F mod m, denoted , and the "rank of apparition" is called the "rank" and denoted .

According to Wall's conjecture, . If  has prime factorization  then .

Generalizations 
The Pisano periods of Lucas numbers are
1, 3, 8, 6, 4, 24, 16, 12, 24, 12, 10, 24, 28, 48, 8, 24, 36, 24, 18, 12, 16, 30, 48, 24, 20, 84, 72, 48, 14, 24, 30, 48, 40, 36, 16, 24, 76, 18, 56, 12, 40, 48, 88, 30, 24, 48, 32, ... 

The Pisano periods of Pell numbers (or 2-Fibonacci numbers) are
1, 2, 8, 4, 12, 8, 6, 8, 24, 12, 24, 8, 28, 6, 24, 16, 16, 24, 40, 12, 24, 24, 22, 8, 60, 28, 72, 12, 20, 24, 30, 32, 24, 16, 12, 24, 76, 40, 56, 24, 10, 24, 88, 24, 24, 22, 46, 16, ... 

The Pisano periods of 3-Fibonacci numbers are
1, 3, 2, 6, 12, 6, 16, 12, 6, 12, 8, 6, 52, 48, 12, 24, 16, 6, 40, 12, 16, 24, 22, 12, 60, 156, 18, 48, 28, 12, 64, 48, 8, 48, 48, 6, 76, 120, 52, 12, 28, 48, 42, 24, 12, 66, 96, 24, ... 

The Pisano periods of Jacobsthal numbers (or (1,2)-Fibonacci numbers) are
1, 1, 6, 2, 4, 6, 6, 2, 18, 4, 10, 6, 12, 6, 12, 2, 8, 18, 18, 4, 6, 10, 22, 6, 20, 12, 54, 6, 28, 12, 10, 2, 30, 8, 12, 18, 36, 18, 12, 4, 20, 6, 14, 10, 36, 22, 46, 6, ... 

The Pisano periods of (1,3)-Fibonacci numbers are
1, 3, 1, 6, 24, 3, 24, 6, 3, 24, 120, 6, 156, 24, 24, 12, 16, 3, 90, 24, 24, 120, 22, 6, 120, 156, 9, 24, 28, 24, 240, 24, 120, 48, 24, 6, 171, 90, 156, 24, 336, 24, 42, 120, 24, 66, 736, 12, ... 

The Pisano periods of Tribonacci numbers (or 3-step Fibonacci numbers) are
1, 4, 13, 8, 31, 52, 48, 16, 39, 124, 110, 104, 168, 48, 403, 32, 96, 156, 360, 248, 624, 220, 553, 208, 155, 168, 117, 48, 140, 1612, 331, 64, 1430, 96, 1488, 312, 469, 360, 2184, 496, 560, 624, 308, 440, 1209, 2212, 46, 416, ... 

The Pisano periods of Tetranacci numbers (or 4-step Fibonacci numbers) are
1, 5, 26, 10, 312, 130, 342, 20, 78, 1560, 120, 130, 84, 1710, 312, 40, 4912, 390, 6858, 1560, 4446, 120, 12166, 260, 1560, 420, 234, 1710, 280, 1560, 61568, 80, 1560, 24560, 17784, 390, 1368, 34290, 1092, 1560, 240, 22230, 162800, 120, 312, 60830, 103822, 520, ... 

See also generalizations of Fibonacci numbers.

Number theory 
Pisano periods can be analyzed using algebraic number theory.

Let  be the n-th Pisano period of the k-Fibonacci sequence Fk(n) (k can be any natural number, these sequences are defined as Fk(0) = 0, Fk(1) = 1, and for any natural number n > 1, Fk(n) = kFk(n−1) + Fk(n−2)). If m and n are coprime, then , by the Chinese remainder theorem: two numbers are congruent modulo mn if and only if they are congruent modulo m and modulo n, assuming these latter are coprime. For example,  and  so  Thus it suffices to compute Pisano periods for prime powers  (Usually, unless p is k-Wall–Sun–Sun prime, or k-Fibonacci–Wieferich prime, that is, p2 divides Fk(p − 1) or Fk(p + 1), where Fk is the k-Fibonacci sequence, for example, 241 is a 3-Wall–Sun–Sun prime, since 2412 divides F3(242).)

For prime numbers p, these can be analyzed by using Binet's formula:
 where  is the kth metallic mean

If k2 + 4 is a quadratic residue modulo p (where p > 2 and p does not divide k2 + 4), then  and  can be expressed as integers modulo p, and thus Binet's formula can be expressed over integers modulo p, and thus the Pisano period divides the totient , since any power (such as ) has period dividing  as this is the order of the group of units modulo p.

For k = 1, this first occurs for p = 11, where 42 = 16 ≡ 5 (mod 11) and 2 · 6 = 12 ≡ 1 (mod 11) and 4 · 3 = 12 ≡ 1 (mod 11) so 4 = , 6 = 1/2 and 1/ = 3, yielding φ = (1 + 4) · 6 = 30 ≡ 8 (mod 11) and the congruence

Another example, which shows that the period can properly divide p − 1, is π1(29) = 14.

If k2 + 4 is not a quadratic residue modulo p, then Binet's formula is instead defined over the quadratic extension field , which has p2 elements and whose group of units thus has order p2 − 1, and thus the Pisano period divides p2 − 1.  For example, for p = 3 one has π1(3) = 8 which equals 32 − 1 = 8; for p = 7, one has π1(7) = 16, which properly divides 72 − 1 = 48.

This analysis fails for p = 2 and p is a divisor of the squarefree part of k2 + 4, since in these cases are zero divisors, so one must be careful in interpreting 1/2 or .  For p = 2,  is congruent to 1 mod 2 (for k odd), but the Pisano period is not p − 1 = 1, but rather 3 (in fact, this is also 3 for even k). For p divides the squarefree part of k2 + 4, the Pisano period is πk(k2 + 4) = p2 − p = p(p − 1), which does not divide p − 1 or p2 − 1.

Fibonacci integer sequences modulo n
One can consider Fibonacci integer sequences and take them modulo n, or put differently, consider Fibonacci sequences in the ring Z/nZ. The period is a divisor of π(n). The number of occurrences of 0 per cycle is 0, 1, 2, or 4. If n is not a prime the cycles include those that are multiples of the cycles for the divisors.  For example, for n = 10 the extra cycles include those for n = 2 multiplied by 5, and for n = 5 multiplied by 2.

Table of the extra cycles: (the original Fibonacci cycles are excluded) (using X and E for ten and eleven, respectively)

Number of Fibonacci integer cycles mod n are:
1, 2, 2, 4, 3, 4, 4, 8, 5, 6, 14, 10, 7, 8, 12, 16, 9, 16, 22, 16, 29, 28, 12, 30, 13, 14, 14, 22, 63, 24, 34, 32, 39, 34, 30, 58, 19, 86, 32, 52, 43, 58, 22, 78, 39, 46, 70, 102, ...

Notes

References

External links
The Fibonacci sequence modulo m
A research for Fibonacci numbers
Fibonacci sequence starts with q, r modulo m

, a video with Dr. James Grime and the University of Nottingham

Fibonacci numbers
Modular arithmetic